Gary French (born 27 June 1963) is an Australian former professional rugby league footballer who played in the 1980s and 1990s. He played as a halfback for the Brisbane Broncos and whilst at the club, regularly understudied for both Allan Langer and Wally Lewis. He also had stints at British clubs Springfield Borough (1987–88) and Castleford (Heritage № 678) (1988–91). French captained Brisbane on one occasion. He is no relation to Queensland State of Origin brothers Brett and Ian French.

Early life
While attending Beaudesert High School, French played for the Australian Schoolboys team in 1981.

Playing career
French played for Souths in their 1985 Brisbane Rugby League premiership grand final win over Wynnum-Manly, kicking the first points of the match.

References

External links
Statistics at rugbyleagueproject.org

1963 births
Living people
Australian rugby league players
Blackpool Borough players
Brisbane Broncos captains
Brisbane Broncos players
Castleford Tigers players
Souths Logan Magpies players
Rugby league players from Brisbane
Rugby league five-eighths
Rugby league halfbacks
Rugby league centres